The Tolmount gas field is a natural gas reservoir and production facility in the UK sector of the southern North Sea, about 36 km of east of Flamborough Head, Yorkshire. It is due to start production in 2022.

The field 
The Tolmount field extends over UK offshore Blocks 42/28c, 42/28d and 42/28e. The field was discovered in 2011 by well 42/28d-12 drilled by the Ensco 92. The reservoir is a lower Leman Sandstone formation and has reserves of 1,000 billion cubic feet (bcf), 540 bcf in the main field, 220 bcf in Tolmount East and 150 bcf in Tolmount Far East.

The Tolmount gas field is jointly owned by Dana Petroleum (50%) and Harbour Energy (50%), ODE Asset Management Limited operates the platform infrastructure.

Development 
Production from the field will be developed in stages. In the first stage (Tolmount Main) gas is produced by an offshore platform and piped to Easington gas terminal. Later stages will entail development of other parts of the field such as Tolmount East produced back to the platform.

Details of the field infrastructure are as shown.

The gas pipeline is known as the Humber Gathering System. It is intended that other prospects in the area, e.g. Mongour, can use the system.

In addition to the Tolmount offshore facilities a new gas process facility was constructed at the Easington terminal to receive and treat the gas prior to shipment into the National Transmission System.

See also 

 Easington gas terminal
 List of oil and gas fields of the North Sea

References 

Natural gas fields in the United Kingdom
North Sea energy